

Walter von Brockdorff-Ahlefeldt (13 July 1887 – 9 May 1943) was a German general (General of the Infantry) during World War II. He was a recipient of the Knight's Cross of the Iron Cross with Oak Leaves. Brockdorff-Ahlefeldt became ill in November 1942 and returned to Germany. He died in a hospital in Berlin.

Brockdorff-Ahlefeldt himself was a descendant of Danish-Holsteiner nobility.

Awards

 Clasp to the Iron Cross (1939) 2nd Class (19 September 1939) & 1st Class (20 October 1939)
 Knight's Cross of the Iron Cross with Oak Leaves
 Knight's Cross on 15 July 1941 as General der Infanterie and commanding general of the II. Armeekorps
 103rd Oak Leaves on 27 June 1942 as General der Infanterie and commanding general of the II. Armeekorps

References

Citations

Bibliography

 
 
 

1887 births
1943 deaths
People from Perleberg
People from the Province of Brandenburg
German Army generals of World War II
Generals of Infantry (Wehrmacht)
Counts of Germany
Recipients of the clasp to the Iron Cross, 1st class
Recipients of the Knight's Cross of the Iron Cross with Oak Leaves
Reichswehr personnel
German Army personnel of World War I
Prussian Army personnel
20th-century Freikorps personnel
Military personnel from Brandenburg